The South American Under-14 Handball Championship is the official competition for Under-14 Men's and Women's national handball teams of South America.

Men

Summary

Medal table

Participating nations

Women

Summary

Medal table

Participating nations

References
 www.panamhandball.org

Handball competitions in South America